Plasmopara lactucae-radicis is a plant pathogen infecting lettuce.

References

Water mould plant pathogens and diseases
Lettuce diseases
Peronosporales
Species described in 1988